Widford may refer to the following places in England:

Widford, Essex
Widford, Hertfordshire
Widford railway station, a closed station
Widford, Oxfordshire (prior to 1844 a detached part of Gloucestershire)